Paul Massie (born Arthur Dickinson Massé; July 7, 1932June 8, 2011) was a Canadian actor and academic. He later became a theater professor at the University of South Florida in the 1970s. He remained on faculty until his retirement as professor emeritus in 1996.

Massie won a BAFTA Award in 1959 for Most Promising Newcomer for his role in the Anthony Asquith film Orders to Kill (1958) in which he portrayed an American bomber pilot in Nazi-occupied France. Also in 1958 he acted in the Peter Hall production of Tennessee Williams' play Cat on a Hot Tin Roof at the Comedy Theatre in London, with Kim Stanley and Leo McKern also in the cast.

Massie played the characters of Dr Jekyll and Mr Hyde in the 1960 Hammer horror film The Two Faces of Dr. Jekyll. Unusually, he played Jekyll in make-up as an older bearded man, and his villainous counterpart Hyde as his young, handsome self. He also appeared in the thriller Sapphire (1959), and The Rebel (1961), a vehicle for British comedian Tony Hancock, as a budding artist. His later films included the British comedies Raising the Wind (1961) and The Pot Carriers (1962).

In 1963, he acted in William Fairchild's play Breaking Point, at the Golders Green Hippodrome, London with John Gregson, fellow Canadian Robert Beatty, and Robert Ayres in the cast. John Barron was director.

In 1965 he appeared in the second episode of the fourth series of the 1960s cult British spy-fi television seriesThe Avengers. In the episode, entitled "The Gravediggers", he played the villainous character Dr. Johnson. 

Later in his career, Massie shifted his focus to teaching, and became a member of the faculty at the University of South Florida in Tampa, where he had often been a guest artist-instructor over the years, first appearing in a 1966 production of Tartuffe. He taught acting, scene study, voice production, clowning, directing and other subjects. He also directed numerous productions at USF.

Paul Massie died on June 8, 2011, in Liverpool, Nova Scotia, at the age of 78. He had resided on the South Shore of Nova Scotia since his retirement from USF in 1996.

Filmography

References

External links

1932 births
2011 deaths
BAFTA Most Promising Newcomer to Leading Film Roles winners
Canadian male film actors
Canadian male television actors
Canadian academics
Male actors from Ontario
People from St. Catharines
University of South Florida faculty